The Argentina national field hockey team, represents Argentina in field hockey and is governed by the Argentine Hockey Confederation (CAH). The current coach is Mariano Ronconi, who was appointed after Germán Orozco was let go in 2020. The team is currently sixth in the FIH World Rankings.

Los Leones (The Lions) are the only team of the Americas to win a gold medal at the Olympic Games. They achieved this after defeating Belgium 4–2 in the final at the 2016 Summer Olympics in Rio de Janeiro, Brazil. Argentina's Olympic gold-winning coach is Carlos Retegui.

Argentina has appeared in every Hockey World Cup, since the first edition in 1973, except the 1998 edition. They won the bronze medal in 2014, their best position in the tournament. They also obtained a bronze medal at the 2008 Hockey Champions Trophy and a silver medal at the 2016–17 Hockey World League.

At a continental level, Argentina is the most winning team in the Americas, having dominated most tournaments they played, including four gold medals at the Pan American Cup and ten gold medals at the Pan American Games.

In November 2015 Argentina reached a historic 5th place in the FIH World Rankings, only to be surpassed after their Olympic gold medal by reaching 1st place in April 2017.

History
The team won the bronze medal at the 2014 World Cup, being ranked 11th in the FIH World Rankings. They also won the bronze medal at the 2008 Champions Trophy, during Carlos Retegui's first period as a coach.

In 2013, during the Hockey World League Semifinals in Johor Bahru, Malaysia, the team along with coach Carlos Retegui decide to name themselves Los Leones (The Lions), matching the nickname chosen by the women's team at the 2000 Summer Olympics in Sydney, Australia.

Argentina didn't have great performances at the Summer Olympics until they won the gold medal at the 2016 edition by defeating Belgium 4–2, when they became the first national hockey team to win that prize for their country.

Competitive record

Summer Olympics

World Cup

Pan American Games

Pan American Cup

South American Games

South American Championship

FIH Pro League

Sultan Azlan Shah Cup

Defunct competitions

Champions Trophy

Champions Challenge I

Hockey World League

*Draws include matches decided on a penalty shoot-out.

Team

Current squad

Squad for the 2023 Men's FIH Hockey World Cup.

Head coach: Mariano Ronconi

Recent call-ups
The following players have been called up for the team in the last 12 months.

Past players

Mario Almada
Manuel Brunet
Maximiliano Caldas
Facundo Callioni
Lucas Cammareri
Matías Cammareri
Agustín Corradini
Fernando Falchetto
Fernando Ferrara
Marcelo Garraffo
Juan Ignacio Gilardi
Juan Pablo Hourquebie
Isidoro Ibarra
Pedro Ibarra
Jorge Lombi
Juan Martín López
Luca Masso
Joaquín Menini
Pablo Moreira
Gabriel Minadeo
Ignacio Ortiz
Matías Paredes
Gonzalo Peillat
Carlos Retegui
Lucas Rey
Lucas Rossi
Juan Manuel Saladino
Sergio Vigil
Lucas Vila
Matías Vila
Rodrigo Vila
Juan Manuel Vivaldi
Fernando Zylberberg

Captains

Coaches

References

External links

FIH profile

 
Americas men's national field hockey teams
National team
Men's sport in Argentina